İlker is a Turkish given name for males. People named İlker include:

 İlker Avcıbay, Turkish footballer
 İlker Başbuğ, Turkish soldier general
 İlker Erbay, Turkish footballer
ilker Kaleli, Turkish actor

Turkish masculine given names